The New Majestic Hotel, on Bukit Pasoh Road in Singapore's Chinatown is a hotel built in 1928. The building originally consisted of four shophouses and a restaurant. It is a boutique hotel under The Unlisted Collection owned by Loh Lik Peng.   

In 2003, the exterior was restored to its original state, and the lobby ceiling was stripped to reveal the previous paintwork. It was reopened as a boutique hotel. The restoration earned it a national Architectural Heritage award. Furnishings include old dentist's chairs and theatre seats, as well as more modern items.   In 2006, a company called Ministry of Design designed the interior architecture for the building.

References

Hotels in Singapore
Chinatown, Singapore
Outram, Singapore